(born 1941 in Tokyo, Japan) is a Japanese businessman. He is best known for being the founder of Epic/Sony Records, former chairman of Sony Computer Entertainment and former CEO of Sony Music Entertainment. He is known for discovering artists such as Motoharu Sano and Tetsuya Komuro.

References

External links 
 Official blog 

1941 births
Living people
Businesspeople from Tokyo
Japanese chief executives
Sony Interactive Entertainment people
Sony Music
Sony people